The Morgenthau report, officially the Report of the Mission of the United States to Poland, was a report compiled by Henry Morgenthau, Sr., as member of the "Mission of the United States to Poland" which was appointed by the American Commission to Negotiate Peace formed by President Woodrow Wilson in the aftermath of World War I. The purpose of the mission was to investigate "alleged Polish pogroms" and the "treatment of the Jewish people" in Poland. The mission consisted of three American members: former US ambassador Henry Morgenthau, Brigadier General Edgar Jadwin of Engineer Corps, and professor of law Homer H. Johnson from Cleveland; and from the British side Sir Stuart M. Samuel. They were selected to investigate accounts of mistreatment of Jews in the newly-reborn Second Polish Republic. The report by Morgenthau was published on October 3, 1919.

The final report "denied the authenticity of the pogroms" but it noted "isolated excesses" of antisemitic nature, in which approximately 300 Polish Jews died, which it attributed to the chaos of the post war situation. It also cleared the Polish government of any role or support for the incidents, although it did chastise it for insensitivity with regard to Jewish issues, and suggested "culpable negligence". Morgenthau also criticized both Zionism and Polish nationalism as well as "widespread antisemitic prejudice" created by contemporary social and political conflicts. The report stated that the condition of Jews in Poland was not satisfactory and could be improved but also noted that the situation had been widely exaggerated. Morgenthau called for improvement in Polish-Jewish relations which required good willed people to stand up against "extremists on both sides".

Popularly regarded as the definitive statement of the commission, in effect, it was a minority opinion released one month ahead of the joint Jadwin-Johnson deposition. The Jadwin-Johnson deposition agreed with the Morgenthau report that no pogroms had occurred, but it downplayed the criticisms of Polish government found in the previous report. It also blamed "German propagandists" for spreading the image of Poles as "barbarous anti-semites".

History

American public opinion was informed primarily by newspaper articles about the Jewish first-party accounts of mistreatment and atrocities committed against them in Eastern Europe during local conflicts such as the Polish-Ukrainian and Polish-Soviet wars which erupted in the aftermath of the World War I. In June 1919, Herbert Hoover, then head of the American Relief Administration (ARA), after discussions with Polish Prime Minister Ignacy Jan Paderewski, wrote to U.S. President Woodrow Wilson warning that the reports of atrocities were damaging the reputation of Poland, a nascent ally being cultivated by the U.S. to counter Soviet Russia. Hoover, whose ARA oversaw relief efforts in Europe, secured the support of Padrewski through blunt warnings that the reports of atrocities against Jews "could develop into a most serious embarrassment to all of us in connection with the relief of Poland." Such pressure for government action reached the point where President Woodrow Wilson sent an official commission to investigate the matter. The Morgenthau commission was dispatched by the United States to verify those reports.

Morgenthau's delegation was met by thousands of Polish Jews in Warsaw and other Polish cities it visited, although Morgenthau – an assimilationist, critical of Jewish nationalism – was shunned by Polish Zionist leaders. While the Polish Jewish press gave the delegation a warm welcome, the non-Jewish Polish press response ranged from cool to overtly hostile with instances of open expressions of anti-Jewish hostility. The daily Robotnicza called for a complete boycott of Polish Jews, while the leading weekly Mysl Niepodlegla accused Wilson of siding against the Polish people in favor of Jews who "live upon usury, fraud, receiving of stolen goods, white slavery, counterfeiting and willful bankruptcy." While Paderewski had welcomed the investigation, Morgenthau found hostility in other Polish political circles, especially from the camps of National Democratic Party ("Endecja") leader Roman Dmowski and his rival, Chief of State Jozef Pilsudski. Compared to Paderewski, who had substantial U.S. support, Pilsudski at the time was regarded as a less reliable military adventurer, and was described by Morgenthau as a "high-class pirate." Pilsudski resented the interference of Morgenthau's mission in Polish affairs, although he was acknowledged as an opponent of the open anti-semitism of Dmowski and a leader committed to a liberal policy towards Jews and other minorities that respected their rights. Morgenthau immersed himself in meetings with representatives of all segments of Polish society from all sides of the dispute. He attended a packed service for the 35 Jewish victims of the Pinsk massacre of April 1919, noting afterward that "This was the first time I ever completely realized what the collective grief of a persecuted people was like."

Incidents identified
The Morgenthau report ultimately identified eight major incidents in the years 1918–1919, and estimated the number of victims at between 200 and 300 Jews. Four of these were attributed to the actions of deserters and undisciplined individual soldiers; none were blamed on official government policy. Among the incidents investigated by the Morgenthau mission was the Pinsk massacre. In Pinsk, a Polish officer accused a group of Jewish civilians who had gathered at a town meeting to discuss the distribution of American relief aid of being Bolsheviks and of plotting against the Poles. Thirty-five of the men were summarily executed. The Morgenthau mission issued a strong condemnation of the commander responsible:While it is recognized that certain information of Bolshevist activities in Pinsk had been reported by two Jewish soldiers, we are convinced that Major Luczynski, the Town Commander, showed reprehensible and frivolous readiness to place credence in such untested assertions, and on this insufficient basis took inexcusably drastic action against reputable citizens whose loyal character could have been immediately established by a consultation with any well known non-Jewish inhabitant. In Lviv (then Lwów or Lemberg) in 1918, after the Polish Army captured the city, 72 Jews were killed by a Polish mob that included Polish soldiers. The report states that in Lviv "disreputable elements [from the Polish Army] plundered to the extent of many millions of crowns the dwellings and stores in the Jewish quarter, and did not hesitate to murder when they met with resistance." Some other events in Poland were later found to have been exaggerated, especially by contemporary newspapers such as the New York Times, although serious abuses against the Jews, including pogroms, continued elsewhere, especially in Ukraine. The result of the concern over the fate of Poland's Jews was a series of explicit clauses in the Versailles Treaty protecting the rights of minorities in Poland. In 1921, Poland's March Constitution gave the Jews the same legal rights as other citizens and guaranteed them religious tolerance.

Conclusions
While critical of some local Polish authorities on scene, the commission also stated that in general the Polish military and civil authorities did do their best to prevent the incidents and their recurrence in the future. It concluded that some forms of discrimination against Jews was of political rather than anti-Semitic nature, rooted in political competition. The report specifically avoided use of the term "pogrom," noting that the term was used to apply to a wide range of "excesses," (Morgenthau's preferred term) and had no specific definition. Tadeusz Piotrowski, noted that Morgenthau reasons for avoiding the word pogrom was based on the chaotic conditions existing within a war zone.

Morgenthau noted that it would be unfair to condemn the entire Polish nation for the acts of renegade troops or mobs, and believed the attacks were not premeditated or the result of a preconceived plan. He noted, however, that "It is believed that these excesses were the result of a widespread anti-Semitic prejudice aggravated by the belief that the Jewish inhabitants were politically hostile to the Polish State."

Jadwin and Johnson submitted their report separately from Morgenthau. As described by Sonja Wentling in an article for  American Jewish History, Morgenthau emphasized that Jews had been deliberately murdered based solely on the fact that they were Jews, while Jadwin and Johnson concluded that the violence against Jews in Poland was largely rooted in Jewish separatism and commercial competition.

Criticism

Assessments of the mission's works varied, with supporters and critics alternately concluding that it had either debunked allegations of Polish anti-semitism or provided support for them. Hoover considered the mission as having done a "fine service," while others considered its findings to be a "whitewash" of Polish atrocities.

The possibility of bias in the Morgenthau report has been discussed by numerous scholars. Professor Andrzej Kapiszewski wrote that the report was influenced by U.S. foreign policy objectives at the time. Professor Neal Pease wrote, "To protect Poland's international reputation against widespread, if exaggerated, accusations of mistreatment of her large Jewish minority, Washington dispatched an investigatory commission led by Henry Morgenthau, one of the most prominent American Jewish political figures. Morgenthau was selected for the job precisely because he was known to be sympathetic to Poland, and his report largely exculpated the Polish government, exactly as expected." Some contemporary responses in the Jewish press accused Morgenthau and Samuel, the Jewish members of the commission, of having presented a "whitewash" of the massacres, and charged them with being guilty of treason.

Notes

References
 
 

Reports of the United States government
Jewish Polish history
1919 documents
1919 in international relations
Reports of the United Kingdom government
1919 in Poland
1919 in the United Kingdom
1919 in the United States